The 1994 Calgary Stampeders finished in 1st place in the West Division with a 15–3 record. They appeared in the West Final but lost to the eventual Grey Cup champions BC Lions.

Offseason

CFL Draft

Preseason

Regular season

Season standings

Season schedule

Awards and records
Jeff Nicklin Memorial Trophy – Doug Flutie (QB)

1994 CFL All-Stars

Western All-Star selections

Playoffs

West Semi-Final

West Final

References

Calgary Stampeders seasons
Calg